Augustine Joseph Leger (born 12 October 1974 in Tokoroa) is a New-Zealand born Tongan rugby union player. He played as centre.

Career

Club career
Leger first played rugby union with the Avondale College team from Auckland, and he played for the New Zealand national under-17 rugby union team, where he played alongside Jonah Lomu and Taine Randell. During his stay in the United States, he played baseball for three years. Leger later returned to New Zealand, to play softball and become a New Zealand, then a Samoan international. He also played rugby union with East Coast and with Counties Manukau in the National Provincial Championship.

International career
Leger was first capped for Tonga during a match against Scotland, on 10 November 2001, at Murrayfield. He was also part of the Tongan roster for the 2003 Rugby World Cup, playing three matches in the tournament, with his last test cap being against Canada, on 29 October 2003, in Wollongong.

References

External links
Gus Leger international statistics
Augustine Joseph Leger at New Zealand Rugby History

1974 births
Living people
Rugby union players from Auckland
Tonga international rugby union players
Tongan rugby union players
Expatriate rugby union players in New Zealand
Rugby union centres